Queens Quay is a prominent street in the Harbourfront neighbourhood of Toronto, Ontario, Canada.
The street was originally commercial in nature due to the many working piers along the waterfront; parts of it have been extensively rebuilt in since the 1970s with parks, condominiums, retail, as well as institutional and cultural development.

History
The road supplanted both Front Street and Lake Shore Boulevard as the most southerly east–west corridor in the city when it was created on reclaimed land in the inner harbour. Sometime after 1919 to the early 1920s the inner harbour was filled in and new slips were created. 

Queens Quay continues to go through a significant transformation.  Originally, it served as an access road for the various ports and slips in the inner harbour. The street between Yonge Street and Parliament Street was home to storage buildings devoted to trade on the Saint Lawrence Seaway, major industries such as the Redpath Sugar Refinery and Victory Mills, as well as small commercial enterprises.  However, the mainly industrial uses along Queens Quay were slowly replaced by commercial and residential uses, mainly high-rise condominiums.  Between 1975 and 1979, a cluster of large, concrete towers were erected at the foot of Bay Street, south of Queens Quay; these included the Westin Harbour Castle and Harbour Square.  In 1990, the 40-storey York Quay towers were built and remain the tallest buildings on Queens Quay.  The scale and density of these and subsequent high-rise development along Queens Quay were criticized for blocking the lake and failing to provide a welcoming realm for visitors. In 1997 City School (Toronto) relocated to 635 Queens Quay West. In 1999, the Toronto Transit Commission opened a dedicated streetcar right-of-way in the median from Bay Street to Bathurst Street.

In 2001, the city planners set out to improve Queens Quay by reclaiming public space for pedestrians and cyclists.  This resulted in the Waterfront Toronto Central Waterfront Public Realm International Design Competition, which was completed in 2006.  In August 2006, the city closed the two eastbound lanes, replacing them with bike lanes as part of the Martin Goodman Trail and additional pedestrian space.  The experiment resulted in an improved public realm and more visitors to the overall waterfront area.

In 2009, Waterfront Toronto announced its plans to turn Queens Quay into a grand lakefront boulevard by placing streetcar lanes in the centre, traffic only on the north side and a pedestrian-focused space on the south side. The plan would restrict Queen's Quay to two traffic lanes, on the north side of the streetcar tracks, similar to the design of the 2006 experiment.  Additionally, the plan calls for the beautification and extension of the Harbourfront streetcar line along Queen's Quay East between Yonge and Cherry Street. The transit right-of-way will be grass-covered.

In 2013 Ontario Square and Canada Square opened. The former is an open public space and the latter a green area. Both replace the former parking lot, which is now underground.

Transportation
Queens Quay is served by two streetcar lines, operating on a dedicated right-of-way. The 509 Harbourfront and 510 Spadina both terminate at Union Station and run along Queens Quay from Bay Street, westward. At Spadina Avenue, the 510 heads north to Spadina station, and the 509 continues west, bound for the Exhibition Loop.

Originally there was to have been an underground station in front of the Westin Harbour Castle Hotel and the  Jack Layton Ferry Terminal,
with underground access to the hotel.  This plan was cancelled when the hotel management became unwilling to share in the cost, and a smaller station was built around the corner under Bay Street.

Plans to add a Queens Quay East light rail line are the subject of a class environmental assessment. Various bus routes currently serve portions of the eastern portion of Queens Quay: the 19 Bay operates from Bay Street to Jarvis Street, the 75 Sherbourne operates from Jarvis Street to Sherbourne Street, and the 97 Yonge and 320 Yonge Blue Night buses operate from Bay Street to Yonge Street.

Landmarks

Quays and slips along Queens Quay
Listed from west to east
 Bathurst Quay (Éireann Quay) - see Ireland Park and Canada Malting Silos
 Spadina Quay
 Peter Street Slip
 Maple Leaf Quays - former site of Maple Leaf Mills Silos
 Rees Street Slip
 John Street Quay
 Simcoe Street Slip
 York Quay
 York Street Slip
 Harbour Square
 Yonge Street Slip
 Pier 27
 Jarvis Street Slip - now Corus Quay
 Redpath Slip
 Parliament Street Slip

References

External links

Roads in Toronto
Harbourfront, Toronto